Sean Dempster (born 20 January 1984) is a former Australian rules footballer who played for the Sydney Swans and St Kilda Football Club in the Australian Football League (AFL).

Early life
Born in 1984, Dempster grew up in the Victorian town of Mallacoota. As there was no football club in the town, Dempster played junior football with the Snowy Rovers Football Club in Orbost. He later playing with Gippsland Power in the TAC Cup before being recruited by the Sydney Swans in the 2002 national AFL draft under the father–son rule – his father, Graham Dempster, having played 64 games for South Melbourne Football Club between 1972 and 1979.

AFL career

Sydney Swans
Dempster played his first AFL game in Round 3, 2005, against the Brisbane Lions wearing guernsey number 26. In the 2005 AFL season, he played 22 matches, first as a defender and later on the wing. He was a member of Sydney's 2005 AFL Grand Final premiership team. In the following AFL season, he played 18 matches, mostly as a defender, including the Sydney losing grand final team. He played a total of 54 games for Sydney before being traded to the St Kilda Football Club with Adam Schneider at the end of the 2007 AFL season.

St Kilda Football Club
Dempster played 19 games for St Kilda in 2008. He injured his knee in Round 22 and was unable to play in the finals that year.

Dempster played in eight of the 22 matches in the 2009 season's home and away rounds in which St Kilda qualified in first position for the finals series, winning the club's third minor premiership.

St Kilda qualified for the 2009 AFL Grand Final after qualifying and preliminary finals wins. Dempster played in the grand final in which St Kilda were defeated by Geelong.

Dempster played 14 games in 2010, including four finals matches.

As of the end of the 2010 season, Dempster had played in 13 finals series matches, including five grand finals.

In 2012, Dempster played all 22 matches of St Kilda's season, and demonstrated strong form throughout. Dempster was named on the half-back flank of the All-Australian team after his impressive season.
 
In April 2017, Dempster announced his retirement from the AFL, effective immediately. The decision came as a result of a number of concussions Dempster suffered throughout his career, deciding it was too much of a risk to play football again and receive another blow to the head, having started a young family. He was the last remaining player from the Sydney Swans' 2005 premiership side to retire.

Statistics
 

|- style="background-color: #EAEAEA"
! scope="row" style="text-align:center" | 2005
|style="text-align:center;"|
| 26 || 22 || 0 || 1 || 91 || 57 || 148 || 42 || 56 || 0.0 || 0.0 || 4.1 || 2.6 || 6.7 || 1.9 || 2.5
|-
! scope="row" style="text-align:center" | 2006
|style="text-align:center;"|
| 26 || 18 || 5 || 2 || 82 || 39 || 121 || 41 || 47 || 0.3 || 0.1 || 4.6 || 2.2 || 6.7 || 2.3 || 2.6
|- style="background:#eaeaea;"
! scope="row" style="text-align:center" | 2007
|style="text-align:center;"|
| 26 || 14 || 3 || 4 || 91 || 60 || 151 || 52 || 28 || 0.2 || 0.3 || 6.5 || 4.3 || 10.8 || 3.7 || 2.0
|-
! scope="row" style="text-align:center" | 2008
|style="text-align:center;"|
| 24 || 19 || 3 || 2 || 132 || 102 || 234 || 72 || 52 || 0.2 || 0.1 || 6.9 || 5.4 || 12.3 || 3.8 || 2.7
|- style="background:#eaeaea;"
! scope="row" style="text-align:center" | 2009
|style="text-align:center;"|
| 24 || 9 || 3 || 4 || 55 || 43 || 98 || 37 || 32 || 0.3 || 0.4 || 6.1 || 4.8 || 10.9 || 4.1 || 3.6
|-
! scope="row" style="text-align:center" | 2010
|style="text-align:center;"|
| 24 || 14 || 1 || 2 || 91 || 82 || 173 || 73 || 49 || 0.1 || 0.1 || 6.5 || 5.9 || 12.4 || 5.2 || 3.5
|- style="background:#eaeaea;"
! scope="row" style="text-align:center" | 2011
|style="text-align:center;"|
| 24 || 23 || 2 || 6 || 181 || 140 || 321 || 91 || 73 || 0.1 || 0.3 || 7.9 || 6.1 || 14.0 || 4.0 || 3.2
|-
! scope="row" style="text-align:center" | 2012
|style="text-align:center;"|
| 24 || 22 || 0 || 2 || 274 || 115 || 389 || 155 || 43 || 0.0 || 0.1 || 12.5 || 5.2 || 17.7 || 7.0 || 2.0
|- style="background:#eaeaea;"
! scope="row" style="text-align:center" | 2013
|style="text-align:center;"|
| 24 || 19 || 1 || 0 || 200 || 102 || 302 || 113 || 35 || 0.1 || 0.0 || 10.5 || 5.4 || 15.9 || 5.9 || 1.8
|-
! scope="row" style="text-align:center" | 2014
|style="text-align:center;"|
| 24 || 22 || 2 || 3 || 255 || 111 || 366 || 136 || 29 || 0.1 || 0.1 || 11.6 || 5.0 || 16.6 || 6.2 || 1.3
|- style="background:#eaeaea;"
! scope="row" style="text-align:center" | 2015
|style="text-align:center;"|
| 24 || 21 || 0 || 0 || 238 || 134 || 372 || 148 || 36 || 0.0 || 0.0 || 11.3 || 6.4 || 17.7 || 7.0 || 1.7
|-
! scope="row" style="text-align:center" | 2016
|style="text-align:center;"|
| 24 || 19 || 1 || 0 || 148 || 109 || 257 || 109 || 27 || 0.1 || 0.0 || 7.8 || 5.7 || 13.5 || 5.7 || 1.4
|- class="sortbottom"
! colspan=3| Career
! 222
! 21
! 26
! 1838
! 1094
! 2932
! 1069
! 507
! 0.1
! 0.1
! 8.3
! 4.9
! 13.2
! 4.8
! 2.3
|}

References

External links

Footy Wire player profile

1984 births
Living people
All-Australians (AFL)
Australian rules footballers from Victoria (Australia)
Sydney Swans players
Sydney Swans Premiership players
St Kilda Football Club players
Gippsland Power players
One-time VFL/AFL Premiership players